Majid Gholami (born January 1, 1985) is an Iranian footballer who plays for Gol Gohar in the Azadegan League.

Club career
Gholami joined Shahin Bushehr F.C. in 2010 after spending the previous season at Aboomoslem. In 2012 after Shahin's relegation to Azadegan League he moved to Gol Gohar Sirjan.

Honours

Club
Hazfi Cup
Runner up:1
2011–12 with Shahin Bushehr

References

1983 births
Living people
Esteghlal Ahvaz players
F.C. Aboomoslem players
Payam Mashhad players
Shahin Bushehr F.C. players
Iranian footballers
Gol Gohar players
Association football goalkeepers
People from Sanandaj